Humphrey is a neighbourhood in Moncton, New Brunswick.

History
See History of Moncton and Timeline of Moncton history

Places of note

Bordering communities

See also

List of neighbourhoods in Moncton
List of neighbourhoods in New Brunswick

References

Neighbourhoods in Moncton